Richard Malcolm Wilkinson (born 24 November 1982) is an English cricketer. Wilkinson is a right-handed batsman who bowls right-arm medium pace. He was born in Birkenhead, Cheshire.

Wilkinson played for the Worcestershire Second XI in one Second XI Championship and two Second XI Trophy matches in the  2000 season. He then played a further four Second XI Trophy matches for the Marylebone Cricket Club Young Cricketers in 2002.

Wilkinson made his first-class debut for Loughborough UCCE against Gloucestershire in 2004. He played four further first-class matches, one in 2004 and three in 2005. His final first-class match came against Worcestershire. In his five first-class matches, he scored 119 runs at a batting average of 19.83, with a high score of 49. With the ball he took 5 wickets at an expensive bowling average of 62.50, with best figures of 2/24. His highest first-class score with the bat came on debut against Gloucestershire, with Wilkinson sharing in a partnership of 78 with Chris Benham, which was the largest partnership in the Loughborough UCCE first-innings.

In 2010, he joined Cheshire where he played seven Minor Counties Championship and four MCCA Knockout Trophy matches from 2010 to 2011.

References

External links
Richard Wilkinson at ESPNcricinfo
Richard Wilkinson at CricketArchive

1982 births
Living people
Sportspeople from Birkenhead
People from Cheshire
English cricketers
Loughborough MCCU cricketers
Cheshire cricketers